The Cilician Campaign of Baybars was a campaign of Baybars in 1276 against the Armenian Kingdom of Cilicia. As a result of the campaign, the Armenian cities were looted and sacked.

Background
Before this campaign, he had also two other campaigns against Armenian kingdom of Cilicia in 1274 which he looted and sacked some cities, the campaign in 1274 was a minor campaign, he than led another campaign in 1275 With his army he left Cairo and than besieged Alexandria, Lattakia, then he raided the full Armenian kingdom of Cilicia.

Campaign
When the losses of the Armenians increased, sultan Baybars decided to go on a campaign, then he ordered Hüsameddin Ayntabi to birecik. He headed to Sermine with the main army and from there to Derbaska. He left some of the soldiers to Sermine under the leadership of Sunqur al-Ashqar. After the Sultan had passed the army, he reached the Derbask and Bağras castles. They went to the top of the mountains. They reached the gate of Alexandria, which was behind the wall built by Hethum's father Leon. The sultan reached the place called maskap from here. He crossed the Misis bridge and entered the city. He walked into the fog. He did not enter the city, he sent soldiers around. He reached the border of Anatolian Seljuks. He took some Tatars captive after the battle of Great Barrack, He returned to the fog and plundered the city and destroyed it. plundered the people.
He also besieged Sis and Misis.

See also
Baybars
Mamluk Sultanate
Ilkhanate
Armenian kingdom of Cilicia

References

Süleyman Ozbek,Sultan Baibars,the Turk who stopped the Mongols,p. 78.

Battles
{|style="width:76%;" class="wikitable"
|-
! style="width:15%;"| Battle
! style="width:8%;"| Year
! style="width:10%;"|Mamluk Commander
! style="width:10%;"|Armenian/Mongol Commander
! style="width:10%;"| Result
|- style="background:#adff2f;"
|align="left"| Battle of Great Barrack || style="text-align:center;"| 1276 || style="text-align:center;"| Baybars || style="text-align:center;"|Unknown Mongol General|| style="text-align:center;"| Mamluk victory
|- style="background:#adff2f;"
|align="left"| Siege of Sis || style="text-align:center;"| 1276 || style="text-align:center;"| Baybars || style="text-align:center;"|Leo II, King of Armenia||style="text-align:center;"|Mamluk victory
|- style="background:#adff2f;"
|align="left"| Siege of Misis || style="text-align:center;"| 1276 || style="text-align:center;"| Baybars || style="text-align:center;"|Unknown|| style="text-align:center;"|Mamluk victory
|- style="background:#adff2f;"
|align="left"| Battle of Birecek || style="text-align:center;"| 1276 || style="text-align:center;"| Hüsamettin Ayntabi || style="text-align:center;"| Unknown Mongol General|| style="text-align:center;"| Mamluk victory 
|- style="background:#adff2f;"
|align="left"| Sack of Ayas || style="text-align:center;"| 1276|| style="text-align:center;"| Sunqur al-Ashqar || style="text-align:center;"| Unknown|| style="text-align:center;"|Mamluk victory
|- style="background:#adff2f;"
|align="left"| Siege of Viranşehir || style="text-align:center;"| 1276|| style="text-align:center;"| Baybars || style="text-align:center;"| Unknown|| style="text-align:center;"|Mamluk victory

Battles involving the Mamluk Sultanate
Cilicia